The 184th Paratroopers Division "Nembo" was an airborne division of the Royal Italian Army during World War II. After the Armistice of Cassibile the division joined the Italian Co-belligerent Army's Italian Liberation Corps and together with the Polish II Corps liberated Ancona in the Battle of Ancona.

History

Formation 
The division was activated on 1 November 1942 in Pisa. The division consisted initially of the 184th Infantry Regiment "Nembo", 185th Infantry Regiment "Nembo", 184th Artillery Regiment "Nembo", CLXXXIV Paratroopers Sappers Battalion, and minor units.

The 185th Infantry Regiment "Nembo" was formed on 1 April 1941 in Tarquinia as 1st Paratroopers Regiment, making it the oldest paratroopers regiment of the Italian Army. On 1 September 1941 the 1st Paratroopers Regiment joined the Paratroopers Division, which was renamed 185th Infantry Division "Folgore" on 27 July 1942. On the same date the 1st Paratroopers Regiment was renamed 185th Infantry Regiment "Folgore". In August 1942 the Folgore division, with the 186th Infantry Regiment "Folgore", 187th Infantry Regiment "Folgore", 185th Artillery Regiment "Folgore", and VIII Paratroopers Sappers Battalion, was sent to Libya to fight in the Western Desert Campaign. The 185th Infantry Regiment "Folgore" remained in Italy to serve as basis for the formation of the 184th Paratroopers Division "Nembo". On 15 September the regiment left the 185th Paratroopers Division "Folgore" changed and consisted of the III, X, and XI paratrooper battalions.

The 184th Infantry Regiment "Nembo" was raised on 24 August 1942 in Florence and consisted of the XII, XIII, and XIV paratrooper battalions, which had been trained at the Royal Air Force Paratroopers School in Tarquinia. The 184th Artillery Regiment "Nembo" was raised on 15 September 1942 in Pisa and consisted of the I and II paratrooper artillery groups, which both had been trained in Tarquinia. The CLXXXIV Paratroopers Sappers Battalion was activated together with the division on 1 November 1942.

Meanwhile the 185th Paratroopers Division "Folgore" fought in the Second Battle of El Alamein during which the division was annihilated by British XIII Corps. On 25 November 1942 the Folgore division was declared lost due to wartime events leaving the Nembo as the only Italian paratroopers division. On 11 January 1943 the army's General Staff ordered to transform the Nembo in a triangular division and therefore on 1 February 1943 the 183rd Infantry Regiment "Nembo" with the XV, XVI, and VIII/bis paratrooper battalions was raised by the Royal Air Force Paratroopers School in Viterbo. The VIII/bis Paratroopers Battalion was formed to replace the original VIII Paratroopers Battalion, which had been reorganized as VIII Paratroopers Sappers Battalion in May 1942 and been destroyed in the Second Battle of El Alamein. The 183rd Infantry Regiment joined the division on 12 April 1943 and was based in Livorno. To complete the division the 184th Artillery Regiment raised a third paratroopers artillery group and the CLXXXIV Paratroopers Sappers Battalion raised a third paratroopers sappers company.

On 30 May 1943 the 183rd Infantry Regiment, 184th Infantry Regiment, and 184th Artillery Regiment received their flags in a ceremony in Florence and the division's troops swore their oath to the King of Italy Victor Emmanuel III. In May 1943 the 183rd Infantry Regiment "Nembo" transferred the VIII/bis Paratroopers Battalion to the 185th Infantry Regiment "Nembo" and received the X/bis Paratroopers Battalion in return. The 185th Infantry Regiment "Nembo" then left the division and became an autonomous unit.

Sardinia 

In early June 1943 the bulk of the division was transferred to Sardinia, while the 185th Infantry Regiment "Nembo" and the III Paratroopers Artillery Group were detached. In Sardinia the division was assigned to XIII Army Corps, which was responsible for the defense of the southern half of the island. The division was divided into tactical groups, which were dispersed in the island's south-western region of Campidano, while one battalion was sent to the north-western region of Nurra. The tactical groups of the Nembo, together with units of the German 90th Panzergrenadier Division, were intended to act as rapid reinforcements for the coastal units garrisoning the beaches where allied forces were expected to land.

The tactical groupings and groups were named after their commanders and based at the following locations:

 184th Paratroopers Division "Nembo", in Villanovaforru
 Grouping "Quaroni", in Assemini
 Command Company/ 183rd Infantry Regiment "Nembo"
 Tactical Group "Gigersa" (XVI Paratroopers Battalion (reinforced)/ 183rd Infantry Regiment "Nembo")
 Tactical Group "Lusena" (XV Paratroopers Battalion (reinforced)/ 183rd Infantry Regiment "Nembo")
 Tactical Group "Conte" (CLXXXIV Paratroopers Sappers Battalion (reinforced))
 Grouping "Renzoni", in Serramanna
 Command Company/ 184th Infantry Regiment "Nembo"
 Tactical Group "Rizzati" (XII Paratroopers Battalion (reinforced)/ 184th Infantry Regiment "Nembo")
 Tactical Group "Corrias" (XIV Paratroopers Battalion (reinforced)/ 184th Infantry Regiment "Nembo")
 Grouping "Invrea", in Marrubiu
 Tactical Group "Del Vita" (XIII Paratroopers Battalion (reinforced)/ 184th Infantry Regiment "Nembo")
 Tactical Group "Cadeddu" (attached: Squadrona Group "Cavalleggeri di Sardegna")
 Tactical Group "Valletti" (X/bis Paratroopers Battalion (reinforced)/ 183rd Infantry Regiment "Nembo") in Fertilia
 Maneuver Grouping "Tantillo" in Sanluri (attached M14/41 tank unit from the 32nd Tank Infantry Regiment)

Armistice of Cassibile 
The announcement of the Armistice of Cassibile on 8 September 1943 and the total lack of communication, orders or news from Rome led to a split in the division: The XII Paratroopers Battalion of the 184th Infantry Regiment "Nembo" decided to side with the Germans. Together with individual soldiers the battalion began to retreat with the German 90th Panzergrenadier Division towards Corsica. The division's Chief of Staff Lieutenant Colonel Alberto Bechi Luserna followed the mutinous troops to try to convince them to return to their positions and respect the chain of command. On 9 September near Borore he caught up with them and was killed together with one of the accompanying Carabinieri officers. The mutineers then dumped his body into the sea when they crossed the Strait of Bonifacio to Corsica. For his courage Alberto Bechi Luserna was awarded Italy highest military honor the Gold Medal of Military Valour.

Following these events the Armed Forces Command Sardinia ordered XIII Army Corps to keep the division under strict surveillance and away from combat operations. Meanwhile the division's commander disbanded the X/bis Paratroopers Battalion of the 183rd Infantry Regiment "Nembo" and the 284th Paratrooper Cyclists Company, which both were deemed unreliable.

Italian Co-belligerent Army 

In January 1944 the 184th Artillery Regiment returned to Italy, where its two groups were equipped with more powerful 75/27 field guns respectively 100/22 howitzers. The regiment also raised a third group equipped with British QF 6-pounder anti-tank guns. In May the rest of the division was transferred to mainland Italy and joined the Italian Co-belligerent Army's Italian Liberation Corps. On 22 May 1944 the 184th Infantry Regiment "Nembo" entered combat followed by the rest of the division on 31 May. For the Battle of Ancona in July 1944 the Italian Liberation Corps was assigned to the Polish II Corps. In this battle the Nembo distinguished itself in the liberation of Filottrano, earning the 183rd Infantry Regiment "Nembo" a Bronze Medal of Military Valor and the 184th Infantry Regiment "Nembo" a War Cross of Military Valor.

On 24 September 1944 the division and most of its units were disbanded and the personnel used to form the Paratroopers Regiment "Nembo" and various support units for the newly activated Combat Group "Folgore", which was equipped with British materiel and uniforms. The 184th Artillery Regiment was re-equipped with British guns and assigned to the Combat Group "Folgore".

In March 1945 the combat group fought at Tossignano and on 19 April 1945 the II Battalion of the Paratroopers Regiment "Nembo" fought a heavy battle against the Fallschirmjäger of the German 1. Fallschirmjäger-Division at Case Grizzano. The paratroopers of the Nembo expelled the Germans from their positions at Case Grizzano and then defeated five German counterattacks, which opened the way for the allied armies to liberate Bologna. During the battle the commander of the battalion, Lieutenant Colonel Giuseppe Izzo, was gravely injured and when he was transported to the rear he was immediately awarded the American Distinguished Service Cross, making him the only Italian recipient of the award in all of World War II. Shortly afterwards Lieutenant Colonel Giuseppe Izzo was also awarded Italy's highest military honor the Gold Medal of Military Valour.

Post War 
On 15 October 1945 the Combat Group "Folgore" was renamed Infantry Division "Folgore", which included among other units the Paratroopers Regiment "Nembo" and 184th Artillery Regiment "Nembo". On 1 December 1948 the Paratroopers Regiment "Nembo" was renamed 183rd Infantry Regiment "Nembo" and remained one of the Folgore division's infantry units until the 1975 army reform, when it was reduced to 183rd Mechanized Infantry Battalion Nembo and assigned to the Mechanized Brigade "Gorizia". On 1 July 1953 the personnel and equipment of the 184th Artillery Regiment "Nembo" were used to reform the 5th Mountain Artillery Regiment.

Organization 
 184th Infantry Division "Nembo"
 Command Company
 183rd Infantry Regiment "Nembo"
 Command Company
 X/bis Paratroopers Battalion
 XV Paratroopers Battalion
 XVI Paratroopers Battalion
 183rd Cannons Company (47/32 anti-tank guns)
 184th Infantry Regiment "Nembo"
 Command Company
 XII Paratroopers Battalion
 XIII Paratroopers Battalion
 XIV Paratroopers Battalion
 184th Cannons Company (47/32 anti-tank guns)
 185th Infantry Regiment "Nembo" 
 Command Company
 III Paratroopers Battalion
 VIII Paratroopers Battalion
 XI Paratroopers Battalion
 185th Cannons Company (47/32 anti-tank guns)
 184th Artillery Regiment "Nembo"
 Command Battery
 I Paratroopers Artillery Group (47/32 anti-tank guns)
 II Paratroopers Artillery Group (47/32 anti-tank guns)
 III Paratroopers Artillery Group (47/32 anti-tank guns)
 2x Paratroopers Anti-aircraft batteries (20/65 Mod. 35 anti-aircraft guns)
 CLXXXIV Paratroopers Sappers Battalion
 184th Paratroopers Motorcyclists Company
 284th Paratroopers Cyclists Company
 184th Paratroopers Mortar Company (81mm Mod. 35 mortars)
 184th Paratroopers Telegraph and Radio Operators Company
 184th Paratroopers Engineer Company
 184th Transport Unit
 324th Carabinieri Section
 184th Medical Section
 184th Supply Section
 146th Field Post Office

Attached to the division in Sardinia:
 Squadrons Group "Cavalleggeri di Sardegna" (L6/40 tanks)

Commanding officers 
The division's commanding officer was:

 Generale di Brigata Ercole Ronco (1 November 1942 - September 1943)
 Generale di Brigata Giorgio Morigi (1943 - 1944)

See also 
 Paracadutisti
 Paratroopers Brigade "Folgore" present day Italian Army airborne brigade

References 

Airborne divisions of Italy
Divisions of Italy in World War II